Treinta y Tres Airport  is an airport serving Treinta y Tres, capital of the Treinta y Tres Department of Uruguay. The airport is just northeast of the city.

See also

Transport in Uruguay
List of airports in Uruguay

References

External links
OpenStreetMap - Treinta y Tres
OurAirports - Treinta y Tres Airports

Airports in Uruguay
Buildings and structures in Treinta y Tres Department